Ardozyga hilara is a species of moth in the family Gelechiidae. It was described by Turner in 1919. It is found in Australia, where it has been recorded from Victoria.

The forewings are dark-fuscous with a few scattered whitish scales. The stigmata are blackish, scarcely discernible and there is a whitish suffused spot above the tornus. The hindwings are orange with some fuscous scales on the apex and termen.

References

Ardozyga
Moths described in 1919
Moths of Australia